Batesville is the county seat and largest city of Independence County, Arkansas, United States, 80 miles (183 km) northeast of Little Rock, the state capital. According to the 2010 Census, the population of the city was 10,268. The city serves as a regional manufacturing and distribution hub for the Ozark Mountain region and Northeast Arkansas.

History 

Batesville is the second oldest municipality after the town of Georgetown — and the oldest city — in the state of Arkansas. It was named for the first territorial delegate from Arkansas to the Congress of the United States, James Woodson Bates, who settled in the town. The town has also gone by the names of Napoleon and Poke Bayou.

In early days, Batesville was an important port on the White River and served as an entry point to the interior of northern Arkansas.  Batesville played a large role in the settling of the Ozark Mountains region and served as the central land office for northern Arkansas.

The first known settlement of the Batesville area was in 1810 near the mouth of Polk Bayou, and by 1819 the town had a ferry across the White River and about a dozen houses. The town was partially laid out in early 1821, and on March 3, 1822 a bill of assurance was recorded and executed and the town's plat was laid out. Batesville became the county seat in 1821. In January 1822, Judge Richard Searcy opened the town's first state circuit court. The town's first post office was established in 1822, and in 1830 became the home of a county court. On 25 September 1836, shortly after Arkansas was granted its statehood, Governor Conway incorporated Batesville Academy, the state's first academy. In the past, the area in and around the city had extensive quarries of manganese ore, phosphate rock, sandstone, limestone, and marble.

Between 1940 and 1941, Batesville had its own minor league baseball team within the Northeast Arkansas League known as the Batesville Pilots. The team later disbanded in 1941.

Batesville currently has only one high school within the city limits, Batesville High School. Also, Batesville is the home of Lyon College, a private liberal arts college affiliated with the Presbyterian Church (U.S.A.), and noted for the annual Arkansas Scottish Festival each fall. In addition, the city is home to the University of Arkansas Community College at Batesville (UACCB), and NASCAR driver Mark Martin. It contains three National Register Historic Districts and many properties separately listed on the National Register of Historic Places. It was listed in Norman Crampton's 1992 book The 100 Best Small Towns in America, ranking at #75.

Geography
Batesville is located at  (35.773488, -91.641338).  Batesville lies on the White River.

Demographics

2020 census

As of the 2020 United States census, there were 11,191 people, 3,985 households, and 2,448 families residing in the city.

2010 census
As of the census of 2010, there were 10,243 people, 3,777 households, and 2,383 families residing in the city. The racial makeup of the city was 83.2% White, 4.3% Black or African American, 0.6% Native American, 1.5% Asian, 0.3% Pacific Islander, 1.40% from other races, and 2.00% from two or more races.  4.6% of the population were Hispanics or Latinos of any race.

There were 3,777 households, out of which 28.5% had children under the age of 18 living with them, 49.4% were married couples living together, 10.5% had a female householder with no husband present, and 36.9% were non-families. 33.8% of all households were made up of individuals, and 16.9% had someone living alone who was 65 years of age or older.  The average household size was 2.28 and the average family size was 2.92.

The age distribution was 22.0% under the age of 18, 12.0% from 18 to 24, 25.6% from 25 to 44, 22.2% from 45 to 64, and 18.2% who were 65 years of age or older.  The median age was 38 years. For every 100 females, there were 88.0 males.  For every 100 females age 18 and over, there were 84.1 males.

The median income for a household in the city was $33,133, and the median income for a family was $42,634. Males had a median income of $31,068 versus $20,506 for females. The per capita income for the city was $17,753.  About 11.1% of families and 14.5% of the population were below the poverty line, including 15.1% of those under age 18 and 16.6% of those age 65 or over.

Education
Batesville Public Schools are part of the Batesville School District, Arkansas. The district has one early learning center, one junior high school, one high school and three elementary schools. Students attend Batesville High School.

Infrastructure

List of highways 
 U.S. Highway 167
 Arkansas Highway 25
 Arkansas Highway 69
 Arkansas Highway 69 Business
 Arkansas Highway 106
 Arkansas Highway 233
 Arkansas Highway 394

Notable people

 Elisha Baxter, thirteenth governor of Arkansas
Jack Critcher, local and state politician
 Monroe L. Flinn, Illinois state representative
 Ryan Mallett, quarterback for Arkansas Razorbacks and NFL's Baltimore Ravens, born in Batesville
 Mark Martin, member of the NASCAR Hall of Fame and avid Anime consumer, born and raised in Batesville
 Mike McQueen, lived in Batesville after retiring from Major League Baseball and died in Batesville in 2017
 James McLean, Democrat former member of the Arkansas House of Representatives for Independence County 
 William R. Miller, first native-born governor of Arkansas, born in Batesville 1823
 Rick Monday, Major League Baseball player and Los Angeles Dodgers broadcaster, born in Batesville
 Mutha's Day Out, 1990s rock band
 Leslie Rutledge, Arkansas Attorney General 
 Sami Jo, country singer
 Charlie Strong, football head coach at University of South Florida, former Texas and Louisville coach
 James Sturch, Republican member of Arkansas House of Representatives for Independence County since 2015

Climate

The climate in this area is characterized by hot, humid summers and generally mild to cool winters.  According to the Köppen Climate Classification system, Batesville has a humid subtropical climate, abbreviated "Cfa" on climate maps.

References

External links

City of Batesville, the official website of the City of Batesville
MyBatesville.org, the official page of the Batesville Area Chamber of Commerce
GuardOnline.com, the online edition of the Batesville Daily Guard newspaper
Batesville Preservation Association, a local organization dedicated to preservation and restoration of the area's historic buildings
Old Independence Regional Museum
 Encyclopedia of Arkansas History & Culture entry: Batesville (Independence County)
 Ozark Weather & Radar

 
1821 establishments in Arkansas Territory
Cities in Arkansas
Cities in Independence County, Arkansas
Micropolitan areas of Arkansas
Populated places established in 1821
County seats in Arkansas